Antonia Bernasconi (1741–1803) was a German operatic soprano, appearing in opera houses in Vienna, Milan, Venice, Naples and London.

Life
Bernasconi was born in Stuttgart in 1741; her father, named Wagele. was a valet de chambre of the Prince of Württemberg; after Wagele's death his widow married Andrea Bernasconi, Kapellmeister of the court at Munich and composer. Antonia received early music lessons from her stepfather, and she sang in Munich and other German cities. From 1765 she took part in operas in Vienna; her first appearance in a major role was at the Burgtheater in December 1767, in Alceste, which Gluck had written expressly for her.

In 1770, at the Teatro Regio Ducale in Milan, she took the part of Aspasia in the premiere of Mozart's early opera Mitridate, re di Ponto. She distrusted the powers of the boy, aged fourteen, to compose the arias for her, and requested  to see what she was to sing, to which he acceded. She tried a piece, and was charmed with it. Mozart then, piqued at her want of confidence, gave her another, and a third, leaving Bernasconi quite confounded with so rare a talent and so rich an imagination at years so tender. Shortly afterwards Quirino Gasparini called on her with the words of the libretto set to different music, and endeavoured to persuade her not to sing the music of the young Mozart. She refused, being quite overjoyed at the arias Mozart had written for her. The opera had a prodigious success.

She was in Venice at the Teatro San Benedetto in 1771–72, and in Naples at the Teatro di San Carlo in 1772–73. In 1778 she went to London, and appeared with Gaspare Pacchierotti in Demofonte, a pasticcio, at the Haymarket Theatre. She remained in London until 1780, in opera seria roles in the 1778–79 season and in opera buffa roles in 1779–1780. Julian Marshall wrote: "She was then a good musician, and a correct and skilful singer; but her voice was not powerful, and she was past her prime."

Bernasconi settled in Vienna; in 1781 she was in Alceste and Iphigénie en Tauride of Gluck, and a comic opera La contadina in corte by Antonio Sacchini, which she had sung with success in London. She died in Vienna in 1803.

References

Attribution
 

1741 births
1803 deaths
Musicians from Stuttgart
German operatic sopranos
18th-century German women opera singers